NGC 2353 is a loosely bound open cluster located in the constellation Monoceros. It has an apparent magnitude of 7.1 and an approximate size of 20 arc-minutes. The cluster is dominated by the magnitude 6.0 star HIP 34999, which lies at the southern edge of the cluster.

The asterism NGC 2351 lies 19 arc-minutes southeast of NGC 2353.

References

Open clusters
2353
Monoceros (constellation)